The 2016–17 season was Villarreal Club de Fútbol's 94th season in existence and the club's 4th consecutive season in the top flight of Spanish football. In addition to the domestic league, Villarreal participated in this season's editions of the Copa del Rey, the UEFA Champions League and the UEFA Europa League. The season covered the period from 1 July 2016 to 30 June 2017.

Players

Current squad

Out on loan

Competitions

Overall record

La Liga

League table

Results summary

Results by round

Matches

Copa del Rey

Round of 32

Round of 16

UEFA Champions League

Play-off

UEFA Europa League

Group stage

Knockout phase

Round of 32

Statistics

Appearances and goals
Last updated on 21 May 2017

|-
! colspan=14 style=background:#dcdcdc; text-align:center|Goalkeepers

|-
! colspan=14 style=background:#dcdcdc; text-align:center|Defenders

|-
! colspan=14 style=background:#dcdcdc; text-align:center|Midfielders

|-
! colspan=14 style=background:#dcdcdc; text-align:center|Forwards

|-
! colspan=14 style=background:#dcdcdc; text-align:center| Players who have made an appearance or had a squad number this season but have left the club

|}

Kits

References

Villarreal CF seasons
Villarreal CF
Villarreal CF
Villarreal CF